Marc López and David Marrero were the defending champions, but lost in the first round to Andreas Beck and Christopher Kas.

Austrian couple Oliver Marach and Alexander Peya won the title beating František Čermák and Filip Polášek in the final, 6–4, 6–1.

Seeds

Draw

Draw

References
 Main Draw

International German Open - Doubles
2011 International German Open